Auguste Jean Baptiste Castille (12 May 1883 – 17 September 1971) was a French gymnast. He competed at the 1900 Summer Olympics and the 1908 Summer Olympics.

References

External links
 

1883 births
1971 deaths
French male artistic gymnasts
Olympic gymnasts of France
Gymnasts at the 1900 Summer Olympics
Gymnasts at the 1908 Summer Olympics
People from Elbeuf
Sportspeople from Seine-Maritime